Heinrich Carl Knopf (1839–1875) was a German bowmaker or bogenmacher.

Knopf came from a dynasty of bow makers. He studied bow making in Markneukirchen under his uncle, Christian Knopf.
He was a journeyman in Leipzig working for Ludwig Bausch. Upon the death of his father, Karl Wilhelm, he returned to Markneukirchen where he became his successor.
He also supplied bows to German shops such as Bausch, R. Weichold and the Russian Nicolaus Kittel. 

"The bows (he) made for Kittel are quite different in style from the ones he supplied to the German shops." — Kenway Lee

"His bows are exquisite, showing  mastery in technical as well as stylistic  aspects. His son, Heinrich Richard gen. Knopf (1860–1939)  (known as Henry) became an excellent bow & violin maker who established what was to become a very important and successful shop in New York City (from 1879–1931)."

Auction World Record: Tarisio Berlin October 2021 Lot 80 Violin Bow Nikolai KITTEL made by Heinrich Knopf (c.1865-70) €94,400 = US$109,500

References

STRAD magazine June 2021 - Knopf Dynasty (A Tangled Web), by Gennady Filimonov
 Die Geigen und Lautenmacher -  by Lutgendorff, Frankfurt 1922
STRAD magazine - "Nikolaus Ferder Kittel: The Russian Tourte" by Harvey and Georgeanna Whistler
Encyclopedia of the Violin - Alberto  Bachmann
 
 
 
VSA 14 #2 1995 Nicolaus Kittel: The Russian Tourte by Kenway Lee 183
Deutsche Bogenmacher-German Bow Makers  Klaus Grunke, Hans Karl Schmidt, Wolfgang Zunterer 2000

1839 births
1875 deaths
Bow makers
German luthiers
People from Markneukirchen